Carlyle "Carl" McKinley (1847 - August 24, 1904) was a soldier, theological student, cotton broker, newspaper editor, poet, and essayist in the United States. He lived in South Carolina and served in the Confederate Army during the American Civil War.

McKinley wrote for the Charleston News and Courrier. Notable reports written by McKinley include his reporting on a hurricane that hit Charleston on August 25, 1885. and his report on an earthquake that hit Charleston on August 31, 1886.

He was a proponent of "black expatriation".

Works
An appeal to Pharaoh; the negro problem, and its radical solution. Fords, Howard & Hulbert, New York (1890).
"Timrod Souvenir', in honor of Henry Timrod

References

External links

1847 births
1904 deaths
People of South Carolina in the American Civil War
Confederate States Army soldiers
American textile industry businesspeople
19th-century American businesspeople
Businesspeople from Charleston, South Carolina
Journalists from South Carolina
19th-century American poets
American male poets
Poets from South Carolina
American male essayists